Dungripali railway station is a railway station on the East Coast Railway network in the state of Odisha, India. It serves Dungripali village. Its code is DJX. It has two platforms. Passenger, Express and Superfast trains halt at Dungripali railway station.

Major Trains

 Puri - Durg Express
 Ispat Express

References

See also
 Subarnapur district

Railway stations in Subarnapur district
Sambalpur railway division